Sergei Vladimirovich Konyagin (born 25 April 1957) is a Russian mathematician. He is a professor of mathematics at the Moscow State University.

Konyagin participated in the International Mathematical Olympiad for the Soviet Union, winning two consecutive gold medals with perfect scores in 1972 and 1973. At the age of 15, he became one of the youngest people to achieve a perfect score at the IMO.

In 1990 Konyagin was awarded the Salem Prize.

In 2012 he became a fellow of the American Mathematical Society.

Selected works

References

External links

1957 births
Living people
20th-century Russian mathematicians
21st-century Russian mathematicians
Academic staff of Moscow State University
International Mathematical Olympiad participants
Fellows of the American Mathematical Society